The qualification competition for the 1997 FIBA Europe Under-16 Championship consisted in two different qualification rounds: the Qualifying Round and the Challenge Round. Greece, Macedonia and Italy, as third, fourth and fifth place in the previous tournament, received a bye to the Challenge Round. Croatia, as title holder, Spain, as runner-up, and Belgium, as host, qualified directly for the tournament.

Qualifying round
Twenty-three national teams entered in this round. They were allocated in five groups (three groups of five teams and two groups of four teams). The top three teams advanced to the Challenge Round, where they joined Greece, Macedonia and Italy.

Teams in italics hosted the mini-tournament.

Group A
The matches were played on April 19–21, 2006.

Group B
The matches were played on April 17–21, 2006.

Group C
The matches were played on April 17–21, 2006.

Group D
The matches were played on April 12–14, 2006.

Group E
The matches were played on April 17–21, 2006.

Challenge round
The fifteen national teams entering from the Qualifying Round joined Greece, Macedonia and Italy in this round. The eighteen teams were allocated in three groups of six teams each. The three top teams of each group advanced to the final tournament, where they joined Croatia, Spain, and Belgium.

Teams in italics hosted the mini-tournament.

Group A

Group B

Group C

References
 FIBA Archive
 FIBA Europe Archive

1995–96 in European basketball
1997